Major General Edward Thompson Dickson (16 July 1850 – 23 August 1938) was a British Army general officer, who commanded two Territorial Force divisions before the First World War.

Military career
He was born in St. Helier, Jersey, the son of Major-General E. J. Dickson and his wife Louisa Maria Dickson. After studying at Cheltenham College and the Royal Military College, Sandhurst, he was commissioned into the 49th Regiment of Foot in 1869. In 1881 the regiment amalgamated to become the Princess Charlotte of Wales's (Royal Berkshire Regiment).

In the Suakin Expedition of 1885 he saw action at the Battles of Suakin, Hasheen, Tofrek, and Ginnis, and was appointed brigade-major in the Sudan Field Force. He was later appointed to command the 1st Battalion Royal Berkshire Regiment from 1891 to 1895, and promoted to colonel on 30 April 1895. He was in command of the 49th Regimental District (Royal Berkshire Regiment, based in Reading, Berkshire) from 1 May 1897 to 6 September 1902, when he was placed on half-pay. The following month he was appointed to the staff to command the troops at Barbados, where he arrived in November taking command of the troops in the West Indies, with the local rank of brigadier-general. He was in 1905 promoted to the post of General Officer Commanding the forces in West Africa. In 1906 he returned to England as the Major-General responsible for administration in Eastern Command, a post he held until 1908. That year, he was appointed the first General Officer Commanding of the newly formed West Lancashire Division in the Territorial Force, and in 1909 took command of the Home Counties Division. He remained in command of the division until 1912, when he retired to Tunbridge Wells.

Dickson married Helene Frances Harvey, eldest daughter of Colonel W. F. Harvey, in 1878, and they had one daughter.

Notes

References
 "DICKSON, Major-General Edward Thompson", in 
 Obituary in The Times, p. 13, 24 August 1938

|-

1850 births
1938 deaths
Military personnel from London
British Army major generals
British Army personnel of the Mahdist War
Graduates of the Royal Military College, Sandhurst
Jersey military personnel
People from Saint Helier
49th Regiment of Foot officers
Royal Berkshire Regiment officers
Territorial Force officers